Qalandar Baba Auliya is the title of the Sufi Scholar and Mystic Muhammad Azeem Barkhiyya (1898 – 27 January 1979), the founder of the Azeemia order of Sufis. He was given the honorifics Abdal-i-Haq and  Hasn-e-Ukhra.

One week before his death he told his followers and friends; "I am a guest here for a maximum of one week". He appointed Khwaja Shamsuddin Azeemi head of the order of the Azeemia and died, on 27 January 1979. His tomb is in the Shadman Town subdivision of Karachi.

See also
Sufism
Auliya
Tajuddin Muhammad Badruddin
Azeemia

References

External links

صفحۂ اول
About Us - iazeemi.com
Qalandar Baba Auliya - Official website of Silsila-e-Azeemia
Huzur Qalander Baba Aulia  Biography Qalandar Ba Ba Auliya
Welcome to the Official Website of Silsila-e-Azeemia Official Website
Azeemia Sufi Order. Official Website. Meditation Halls Network
 Pictures of Shrine of Qalandar Baba Aulia
Urs 2009 (Canada) - video Dailymotion See the short documentary of Qalandar Baba Auliya

Pakistani Sufi religious leaders
Pakistani philosophers
Pakistani scholars
1898 births
1979 deaths
Indian Sufis
Pakistani Sufis
Urdu-language writers
Muhajir people
People from Bulandshahr district
People from British India
20th-century Indian Muslims
20th-century Indian philosophers
20th-century Pakistani people
20th-century Islamic religious leaders
20th-century Muslim scholars of Islam
Shrines in Pakistan